Charles VI (3 December 136821 October 1422), nicknamed the Beloved and later the Mad ( or le Fou), was King of France from 1380 until his death in 1422.  He is known for his mental illness and psychotic episodes that plagued him throughout his life.

He ascended the throne at the young age of eleven, his father leaving behind a favorable military situation, marked by the reconquest of most of the English possessions in France. First placed under the regency of his uncles, the Dukes of Burgundy, Anjou, Berry, and Bourbon, Charles decided in 1388, aged 20, to emancipate himself. In 1392, while leading a military expedition against the Duchy of Brittany, the king had his first attack of delirium, during which he attacked his own men in the forest of Le Mans. A few months later, following the Bal des Ardents (January 1393) where he narrowly escaped death from burning, Charles was again placed under the regency of his uncles, the dukes of Berry and Burgundy.

From then on, and until his death, the king alternated between periods of mental instability and lucidity. Power was held by his influential uncles and by his wife, Queen Isabeau of Bavaria. His younger brother, Louis d'Orléans, also aspired to the regency and saw his influence grow. The enmity between Louis d'Orléans and John the Fearless, successor of Philip the Bold as Duke of Burgundy, plunged France into the Armagnac–Burgundian Civil War of 1407–1435, during which the king found himself successively controlled by one or the other of the two parties.

In 1415 his army was crushed by the English at the Battle of Agincourt, which led to Charles' signing of the Treaty of Troyes, which entirely disinherited his son, the Dauphin and future Charles VII, in favour of his future son-in-law Henry V of England. Henry was thus made regent and heir to the throne of France, and Charles married him to his daughter Catherine de Valois. However, Henry died shortly before Charles, which gave the House of Valois the chance to continue the fight against the House of Lancaster, leading to eventual Valois victory and the end of the Hundred Years' War in 1453. Charles was succeeded in law by his grandson, the infant Henry VI of England, but Charles' own son was crowned first in Reims Cathedral and was widely regarded even before his coronation as the true heir by the French people.

Early life
Charles was born in Paris, in the royal residence of the Hôtel Saint-Pol, on 3 December 1368, the son  of King Charles V of the House of Valois and of Joanna of Bourbon. As the eldest son of the king, Charles was heir to the French throne and held the title Dauphin of France.

King of France

Regency
At his father's death on 16 September 1380, he inherited the throne of France. His coronation took place on 4 November 1380, at Reims Cathedral. Charles VI was only 11 years old when he was crowned King of France.  During his minority, France was ruled by Charles' uncles, as regents. Although the royal age of majority was 14 (the "age of accountability" under Roman Catholic canon law), Charles terminated the regency at the age of 21.

The regents were Philip the Bold, Duke of Burgundy, Louis I, Duke of Anjou, and John, Duke of Berry – all brothers of Charles V – along with Louis II, Duke of Bourbon, Charles VI's maternal uncle. Philip took the dominant role during the regency. Louis of Anjou was fighting for his claim to the Kingdom of Naples after 1382, dying in 1384; John of Berry was interested mainly in the Languedoc, and not particularly interested in politics; and Louis of Bourbon was a largely unimportant figure, owing to his personality (showing signs of mental instability) and status (since he was not the son of a king).

During the rule of his uncles, the financial resources of the kingdom, painstakingly built up by his father Charles V, were squandered for the personal profit of the dukes, whose interests were frequently divergent or even opposing. During that time, the power of the royal administration was strengthened and taxes re-established. The latter policy represented a reversal of the deathbed decision of the king's father Charles V to repeal taxes, and led to tax revolts, known as the Harelle. Increased tax revenues were needed to support the self-serving policies of the king's uncles, whose interests were frequently in conflict with those of the crown and with each other.  The Battle of Roosebeke (1382), for example, brilliantly won by the royal troops, was prosecuted solely for the benefit of Philip of Burgundy. The treasury surplus carefully accumulated by Charles V was quickly squandered.

Charles VI brought the regency to an end in 1388, taking up personal rule. He restored to power the highly competent advisors of Charles V, known as the Marmousets, who ushered in a new period of high esteem for the crown. Charles VI was widely referred to as Charles the Beloved by his subjects.

Mental illness

Charles VI's early successes with the Marmousets as his counselors quickly dissipated as a result of the bouts of psychosis he experienced from his mid-twenties.  Mental illness may have been passed on for several generations through his mother, Joanna of Bourbon. Although still called by his subjects Charles the Beloved, he became known also as Charles the Mad.

Charles's first known episode occurred in 1392 when his friend and advisor, Olivier de Clisson, was the victim of an attempted murder. Although Clisson survived, Charles was determined to punish the would-be assassin, Pierre de Craon, who had taken refuge in Brittany. John V, Duke of Brittany, was unwilling to hand him over, so Charles prepared a military expedition.

Contemporaries said Charles appeared to be in a "fever" to begin the campaign and disconnected in his speech. Charles set off with an army on 1 July 1392. The progress of the army was slow, driving Charles into a frenzy of impatience. As the king and his escort were traveling through the forest near Le Mans on a hot August morning, a barefoot leper dressed in rags rushed up to the King's horse and grabbed his bridle. "Ride no further, noble King!" he yelled: "Turn back! You are betrayed!" The king's escorts beat the man back, but did not arrest him, and he followed the procession for half an hour, repeating his cries. The company emerged from the forest at noon. A page who was drowsy from the sun dropped the king's lance, which clanged loudly against a steel helmet carried by another page. Charles shuddered, drew his sword and yelled "Forward against the traitors! They wish to deliver me to the enemy!" The king spurred his horse and began swinging his sword at his companions, fighting until one of his chamberlains and a group of soldiers were able to grab him from his mount and lay him on the ground. He lay still and did not react, but then fell into a coma; as a temporary measure, the king was taken to the castle of Creil, where good air and pleasant surroundings might bring him to his senses. He had killed a knight known as "The Bastard of Polignac" and several other men.

Periods of mental illness continued throughout the king's life. During one in 1393, he could not remember his name and did not know he was king. When his wife came to visit, he asked his servants who she was and ordered them to take care of what she required so that she would leave him alone. During an episode in 1395–96 he claimed he was Saint George and that his coat of arms was a lion with a sword thrust through it. At this time, he recognized all the officers of his household, but did not know his wife nor his children. Sometimes he ran wildly through the corridors of his Parisian residence, the Hôtel Saint-Pol, and to keep him inside, the entrances were walled up. In 1405, he refused to bathe or change his clothes for five months. His later psychotic episodes were not described in detail, perhaps because of the similarity of his behavior and delusions. Pope Pius II, who was born during the reign of Charles VI, wrote in his Commentaries that there were times when Charles thought that he was made of glass, and thus tried to protect himself in various ways so that he would not break. He reportedly had iron rods sewn into his clothes so that he would not shatter if he came into contact with another person. This condition has come to be known as glass delusion.

Charles VI's secretary, Pierre Salmon, spent much time in discussions with the king while he was intermittently psychotic. In an effort to find a cure for the king's illness, stabilize the turbulent political situation, and secure his own future, Salmon supervised the production of two distinct versions of the beautifully illuminated guidebooks to good kingship known as Pierre Salmon's Dialogues.

Bal des Ardents

On 29 January 1393, a masked ball, which later became known as the Bal des Ardents ("Ball of the Burning Men"), had been organized by Isabeau of Bavaria to celebrate the wedding of one of her ladies-in-waiting at the Hôtel Saint-Pol. At the suggestion of Huguet de Guisay, the king and four other lords dressed up as wild men and they were dancing around. They were dressed "in costumes of linen cloth sewn onto their bodies and soaked in resinous wax or pitch to hold a covering of frazzled hemp, so that they appeared shaggy & hairy from head to foot". At the suggestion of one Yvain de Foix, the king commanded that the torch-bearers were to stand at the side of the room. Nonetheless, the king's brother Louis I, Duke of Orléans, who had arrived late, approached with a lighted torch in order to discover the identity of the masqueraders, and accidentally set one of them on fire. There was panic as the flames spread. The Duchess of Berry threw the train of her gown over the king in order to protect him. Several knights who tried to put out the flames were severely burned. Four of the wild men perished: Charles de Poitiers, son of the Count of Valentinois; Huguet de Guisay; Yvain de Foix; and the Count of Joigny. Another – Jean, son of the Lord of Nantouillet – saved himself by jumping into a dishwater tub.

Expulsion of the Jews, 1394
On 17 September 1394, Charles suddenly published an ordinance in which he declared, in substance, that for a long time he had been taking note of the many complaints provoked by the excesses and misdemeanors of the Jews against Christians, and that the prosecutors had made several investigations and discovered that the Jews broke the agreement with the king on many occasions.  Therefore, he decreed, as an irrevocable law and statute, that no Jew should dwell in his domains ("Ordonnances", vii. 675). According to the Religieux de St. Denis, the king signed this decree at the insistence of the queen ("Chron. de Charles VI." ii. 119). The decree was not immediately enforced, a respite being granted to the Jews in order that they have enough time to sell their property and pay their debts. Those indebted to them were enjoined to redeem their obligations within a set time; otherwise their pledges held in pawn were to be sold by the Jews. The provost was to escort the Jews to the frontier of the kingdom. Subsequently, the king released Christians from their debts.

Struggles for power

With Charles VI mentally ill, from 1393 his wife Isabeau presided over a regency council, on which sat the grandees of the kingdom. Philip the Bold, Duke of Burgundy, who acted as regent during the king's minority (from 1380 to 1388), was a great influence on the queen (he had organized the royal marriage during his regency). Influence progressively shifted to Louis I, Duke of Orléans, the king's brother, who was not only another contender for power, but, it was suspected, the queen's lover as well. Charles VI's other uncles were less influential during the regency: Louis II of Naples was still engaged managing the Kingdom of Naples, and John, Duke of Berry, served as a mediator between the Orléans party (what would become the Armagnacs) and the Burgundy party (Bourguignons). The rivalry would increase bit by bit and eventually result in outright civil war.

The new regents dismissed the various advisers and officials Charles had appointed. On the death of Philip the Bold in April 1404, his son John the Fearless took over the political aims of his father, and the feud with Louis escalated. John, who was less linked to Isabeau, again lost influence at court.

Wars with Burgundy and England
In 1407, Louis of Orléans was murdered in the rue Vieille du Temple in Paris. John did not deny responsibility, claiming that Louis was a tyrant who squandered money. Louis' son Charles, the new Duke of Orléans, turned to his father-in-law, Bernard VII, Count of Armagnac, for support against John the Fearless. This resulted in the Armagnac-Burgundian Civil War, which lasted from 1407 until 1435, beyond Charles' reign, though the war with the English was still in progress.

With the English taking over much of the country, John the Fearless sought to end the feud with the royal family by negotiating with the Dauphin Charles, the king's heir. They met at the bridge at Montereau on 10 September 1419, but during the meeting, John was killed by Tanneguy du Chastel, a follower of the Dauphin. John's successor, Philip the Good, the new Duke of Burgundy, threw in his lot with the English.

English invasion and death
Charles VI's reign was marked by the continuing conflict with the English, known as the Hundred Years' War. An early attempt at peace occurred in 1396 when Charles' daughter, the almost seven-year-old Isabella of Valois, married the 29-year-old Richard II of England. By 1415, however, the feud between the French royal family and the House of Burgundy led to chaos and anarchy throughout France, a situation that Henry V of England was eager to take advantage of. Henry led an invasion that culminated in the defeat of the French army at the Battle of Agincourt in October.

In May 1420, Henry V and Charles VI signed the Treaty of Troyes, which named Henry as Charles' successor, and stipulated that Henry's heirs would succeed him on the throne of France. It disinherited the Dauphin Charles, then only 17 years old. (In 1421, it was implied in Burgundian propaganda that the young Charles was illegitimate.) The treaty also betrothed Charles VI's daughter, Catherine of Valois, to Henry (see English Kings of France). Disinheriting the Dauphin in favor of Henry was a blatant act against the interests of the French aristocracy, supported by the Duke of Burgundy.

The Dauphin who had declared himself regent for his father when the Duke of Burgundy invaded Paris and captured the king, had established a court at Bourges.

Charles VI died on 21 October 1422 in Paris, at the Hôtel Saint-Pol. He was interred in Saint Denis Basilica, where his wife Isabeau of Bavaria would join him after her death in September 1435.

Henry V died just a few weeks before him, in August 1422, leaving an infant son, who became King Henry VI of England. Therefore, according to the Treaty of Troyes, with the death of Charles VI, little Henry became King of France. His coronation as such was in Paris (held by the English since 1418) at the cathedral of Notre Dame de Paris on 26 December 1431.

The son disinherited by Charles VI, the Dauphin Charles, continued to fight to regain his kingdom. In 1429, Joan of Arc arrived on the scene. She led his forces to victory against the English, and took him to be crowned in Reims Cathedral as King Charles VII of France on 17 July 1429. He became known as "Charles the Victorious" and was able to restore the French line to the throne of France by defeating the English in 1450.

Marriage and issue
Charles VI married Isabeau of Bavaria ( – 24 September 1435) on 17 July 1385. They had:

Charles had a mistress, Odette de Champdivers. They had: 
Marguerite, bâtarde de France (d. ca. 1458).

Ancestry

Films and television
Harcourt Williams in Henry V (1944)
Paul Scofield in Henry V (1989)
Lambert Wilson in The Hollow Crown (2012)
Thibault de Montalembert in The King (2019)
Alex Lawther in The Last Duel (2021)

See also
 Henry of Marle (died 1418)
 Journal d'un bourgeois de Paris

Notes

References

Sources

External links
 
 
 
 

|-

|-

|-

1368 births
1422 deaths
14th-century kings of France
15th-century kings of France
Burials at the Basilica of Saint-Denis
Ancien Régime
Christians of the Barbary Crusade
Dauphins of France
Dauphins of Viennois
House of Valois
Medieval child monarchs
Nobility from Paris
People of the Hundred Years' War
Royalty and nobility with disabilities
1380s in France
1390s in France
1400s in France
1410s in France
1420s in France
Sons of kings